Mohácsi and its variation are Hungarian surname means "from Mohács":

 Ferenc Mohácsi (born 1929), a Hungarian flatwater canoer
 Viktória Mohácsi (born 1975), a Hungarian Roma politician